Irechek is a summit in the eastern part of the Rila Mountain in southwestern Bulgaria. Its altitude is 2,852 m, making the third highest peak in Rila after Musala (2,925 m) and Malka Musala (2,902 m). It is situated in the vicinity of the summits of Musala and Deno (2,790 m) in the eastern part of the Musala Cirque which contains the Musala Lakes. It is named after the Czech historian Konstantin Jireček, who researched extensively Bulgarian history and following the reestablishment of the Bulgarian state in 1878 was employed by the Bulgarian government.

Citations

References 
 

Mountains of Rila
Landforms of Sofia Province
Two-thousanders of Bulgaria